Riddles in Hebrew are referred to as חידות ḥidot (singular חִידָה ḥidah). They have at times been a major and distinctive part of literature in Hebrew and closely related languages. At times they have a complex relationship with proverbs.

In the Bible 

Riddles are not common in the Bible,<ref>Harry Torcszyner, 'The Riddle in the Bible', Hebrew Union College Annual, 1 (1924), 125-49, https://www.jstor.org/stable/43301983; Othniel Margalith, 'Samson's Riddle and Samson's Magic Locks', 'Vetus Testamentum, 36 (1986), 225-34,
DOI: 10.2307/1518382; https://www.jstor.org/stable/1518382.</ref> nor in Midrashic literature, though other tests of verbal wit are. The most prominent riddle in the Bible is Samson's riddle: Samson outwitted the Philistines by posing a riddle about the lion and the beehive until they learned the answer from his Philistine bride, costing Samson 30 suits of clothes (Judges 14:5-18). However, some passages in the Book of Proverbs in which sets of three or four objects are mentioned (e.g. 30:15 et seq.) were likely originally in the form of riddles. In Ezekiel 17:1-10 is also a riddle of sorts as well as in Habakkuk 2:6-20.

In post-Biblical and rabbinic literature
Sirach mentions riddles as a popular dinner pastime.

The Talmud contains several riddles, such as this one from the end of Kinnim: 'What animal has one voice living and seven voices dead?' ('The ibis, from whose carcass seven different musical instruments are made').

The Aramaic Story of Ahikar contains a long section of proverbial wisdom that in some versions also contains riddles.

Solomon and the Queen of Sheba

The Bible describes how the Queen of Sheba tests Solomon with riddles, but without giving any hint as to what they were. On this basis, riddles were ascribed to the Queen in later writings. Four riddles are ascribed to her in the tenth- or eleventh-century Midrash Proverbs,Christine Goldberg, Turandot's Sisters: A Study of the Folktale AT 851, Garland Folklore Library, 7 (New York: Garland, 1993), p. 24. including the following: 'She said to him: "Seven exit and nine enter, two pour and one drinks". He said to her: "Surely, seven days of menstruation exit and nine months of pregnancy enter, two breasts pour and the baby drinks".’ These plus another fourteen or fifteen tests of wisdom, some of which are riddles, appear in the Midrash ha-Ḥefez (1430 CE), for example:
There is an enclosure with ten doors: when one is open nine are shut; when nine are open, one is shut. — The womb, the bodily orifices, and the umbilical cord.
Living, moves not, yet when its head is cut off it moves. — A ship in the sea (made from a tree).
What was that which is produced from the ground, yet produces it, while its food is the fruit of the ground? — A wick.
The early medieval Aramaic Targum Sheni also contains three riddles posed by the Queen to Solomon.

In the Middle Ages
Under the influence of Arabic literature in medieval al-Andalus, there was a flourishing of literary Hebrew riddles in verse during the Middle Ages. Dunash ben Labrat (920-990), credited with transposing Arabic metres into Hebrew, composed a number of riddles, firmly rooted, like folk-riddles, in describing everyday, physical objects. His diwan includes a twenty-line poem comprising ten riddles, one of which runs:

Subsequent exponents included Samuel ibn Naghrillah (born 993), the sixth section of whose philosophical verse collection Ben Mishlei (literally 'son of Proverbs', but more idiomatically 'after Proverbs') presents a series of philosophically inclined riddles.Sarah J. Pearce, The Andalusi Literary and Intellectual Tradition: The Role of Arabic in Judah Ibn Tibbon's Ethical Will (Bloomington: Indiana University Press, 2017), pp. 68-69 . The subjects of his riddles generally remained concrete — examples include the moon, pen and ink, a boat or fountain — but he began to introduce riddles on abstract themes such as God, wisdom, joy, and folly, with a didactic purpose.
And he said to me: Is there life in death, without a heart?
I answered: foolishness.
And he continued: Is there death in life, with the body intact?
I answered: poverty.
Frequently, the word representing the solution was integrated into the end-rhyme of the poem, making the solution to the riddle the completion of a verse.

Samuel was followed by Moses ibn Ezra (born c. 1055×60), Judah Halevi (born c. 1075), Abraham ibn Ezra (born 1089×92) and Yehuda Alharizi (born 1165).The 1928-29 edition of the works of Solomon ibn Gabirol (born 1021×22) attributes seven riddles to him: . But these have since been reassigned to Dunash ben Labrat: Nehemya Aluny, 'Ten Dunash Ben Labrat's Riddles', The Jewish Quarterly Review, New Series, 36 (1945), 141-46.

Judah is noted as the most prolific Hebrew riddler of his time, with a corpus of at least sixty-seven riddles, some of which survive in his own hand, and even in draft form. These are mostly short, monorhyme compositions on concrete subjects such as everyday artefacts, animals and plants, or a name or word./N. Allony, '' [Thirty autograph riddles by R. Yehudah ha-Lev], /Alei Sefer: A Journal for the Study of the Hebrew Book, 3 (October 1976), 20-43 (repr. Allony, N., 'Šělošim hidot 'otografiot Iě-R. Yehudah ha-Levi, Studies in medieval philology and literature: collected papers, 4: Hebrew medieval poetry, Volume 4 (Jerusalem: Ben Zvi Institute, 1991), pp. 425-48). For example, he wrote:
 Evincing the infinite--
 the size of your palm--
 what it holds is beyond you,
 curious, at hand.
(The answer is 'hand-mirror'.) However, his riddles also include a piece as long as 36 verses, to be solved both as 'pomegranate' and 'Granada'; the solution to some remains the subject of research.

Meanwhile, Abraham is noted for maximising the use of riddles as a meditation on knowledge and the divine.

The Andalusian tradition extended to Italy from the twelfth century, beginning with the work of Yerahmiel Bar Shlomo. Immanuel the Roman wrote riddles, as did Israel Onceneyra.

Post-medieval

In Hebrew-speaking Spain and Italy during around 1650-1850, a baroque sub-genre of the literary riddle called ḥiddat hatsurah vehalo‘ez (literally 'riddles of an emblem with foreign-language passages', known in English simply as 'emblem riddles') flourished. The genre was characterised by alluding to words in languages other than Hebrew (lo‘ez) in order to provide clues to the solution. For example, one riddle includes the Hebrew phrase Eh ko nistarti ('I am hidden somewhere here'). The first two of these words sound the same as the Italian/Spanish word eco ('echo'), and 'echo' (Hebrew hed) is indeed the solution to the poem. Each riddle would include an 'emblem' (tsurah) near the opening in the form of an allusive picture, poem, or phrase, or a combination of these, after which the riddle proper would commence. Poems in this genre were occasional, composed in celebration of specific high-society events such as weddings and circumcisions. The topic of the riddle would often reflect the occasion and audience (with solutions such as 'wisdom' for a gathering of scholars, or 'love' at a wedding), and the riddle might make use of information about the people at the gathering in ways which would make little sense to a wider audience.

At the end of the Haggadah, there is also the Echad Mi Yodea, characterised by Joseph Jacobs as 'a curious riddle'.

See also

 Yehuda Ratzaby, 'Halakhic Poetic Riddles of R. Shalem Me'oded', Sefunot: Studies and Sources on the History of the Jewish Communities in the East (שירי-חידה הלכיים לר' שלם מעודד יהודה רצהבי, ספונות: מחקרים ומקורות לתולדות קהילות ישראל במזרח) New Series /סדרה חדשה, כרך א (טז) (תש"ם), pp. 273–286
 Y. Ratzhaby, 'Ahuda Na' ['Let me Utter Riddles'], Yeda-am, 2 (1954), 36-42.
 Dan Pagis, A Secret Sealed: Hebrew Baroque Emblem-Riddles from Italy and Holland (Jerusalem: The Magnes Press, 1986).
  [Tova Rosen-Moked], “'Testing with Riddles': The Hebrew Riddle of the Middle Ages” [in Hebrew],  [Ha-Sifrut''], 30–31 (1980): 168–83

References

Riddles
Hebrew-language literature